William Craven, 6th Baron Craven (11 September 1738 – 26 September 1791) was an English nobleman and a landowner.

Early life 

He was the son of Rev. John Craven, Vicar of Stanton Lacy, Shropshire (1708–1752), and his wife, Mary Rebecca Hickes (1714–1791), daughter of Rev. Baptist Hickes. He succeeded his uncle, William Craven, as Baron Craven in 1769.

Biography 
In 1775, he built Benham Park at the site of Benham Valence in Speen, Berkshire where he lived with his wife, Lady Elizabeth Berkeley, until she left him in 1780 to travel in Europe. They had issue: three sons and four daughters. After his death on 27 September 1791 at age 53 in Lausanne, Switzerland, she married the Christian Frederick Charles Alexander, Margrave of Brandenburg-Ansbach.

It was Lord Craven who, in 1780, built the original Cottage at what is now an English Premier League stadium Craven Cottage, Fulham.

As Lord Lieutenant of Berkshire from 1786 he also served as Colonel of the Berkshire Militia.

Issue 
His children were:
 William Craven, 1st Earl of Craven (1770–1825), Major-general in the Army and his heir. 
 Hon. Henry Augustus Berkeley (b. 1776), Major-general in the Army
 Hon. Keppel Richard (b. 1779)
 Hon. Elizabeth, married John Edward Maddocks
 Hon. Maria Margaret, married William Molyneux, 2nd Earl of Sefton; she was one of the leaders of London society for many years 
 Hon. Georgiana
 Hon. Arabella, married General the Hon. Frederick St John

References 

1738 births
1791 deaths
Lord-Lieutenants of Berkshire
Royal Berkshire Militia officers
People from Shropshire
People from Speen, Berkshire
William
6